Margaret Aldrich Smith is an American former First Lady of Guam.

Early life 
On October 15, 1863, Smith was born as 
Margaret Aldrich Sampson in Palmyra, New York. Smith's father was Rear admiral William Thomas Sampson (1840–1902). Smith's mother was Margaret Sexton Sampson (1842-1878). Smith has four siblings, including Catherine, Hannah, Olive, and Susan.

Career 
In 1916, when Roy Campbell Smith was appointed the Naval Governor of Guam, Smith became the First Lady of Guam on May 30, 1916, until November 18, 1918.

Personal life 
On October 11, 1887, in Annapolis, Maryland, Smith married Roy Campbell Smith, who later became a Naval officer and the Naval Governor of Guam. They had three children, Roy, Marjorie, and William. Smith and her family lives in places including Guam and Newport, Rhode Island.

Smith's daughter Marjorie Sampson Smith became a sponsor of USS Sampson (DD-63) on March 4, 1916. It was named for Rear admiral William Thomas Sampson, Smith's father. In 1918, Smith's daughter Marjorie Sampson Smith married Spotswood Dandridge Bowers, a lawyer.

On May 21, 1929, Smith died in Newport, Rhode Island. Smith is interred at 	
Lakewood Cemetery in Cooperstown, New York.

References

External links 
 Margaret Aldrich Smith at findagrave.com

1863 births
1929 deaths
First Ladies and Gentlemen of Guam
People from Newport, Rhode Island
People from Palmyra, New York